David McCandless (born 1971) is a British data-journalist, writer and information designer.

Education, personal life
McCandless is an alumnus of Westfield College and lives in London.

Career
McCandless is the founder of the visual blog Information Is Beautiful. Early explorations into the synergy between data visualisation and his work as a journalist led to the development of Information Is Beautiful and the subsequent publication of his book of the same name (titled A Visual Miscellaneum in the United States).

McCandless began his career writing for cult video game magazines such as Your Sinclair and PC Zone in the late 1980s and 1990s before moving on to work for The Guardian and Wired magazine. Since the publication of Information Is Beautiful in 2009, his information design work has appeared in numerous publications, including The Guardian, Wired, and Die Zeit, and has also been showcased at the Museum of Modern Art in New York, the Wellcome Trust gallery in London, and at the Tate Britain. His second book, Knowledge Is Beautiful, was published in 2014.

Bibliography 
 Information is Beautiful (2009)
 Knowledge is Beautiful (2014)

References

External links
 
 Information Is Beautiful: ideas, issues, knowledge, data — visualized!
 David McCandless profile & articles, The Guardian
 The Hierarchy of Digital Distractions digital exhibition at the Museum of Modern Art, New York
 Knowledge Is Beautiful by David McCandless – Review
 

1970s births
Alumni of Westfield College
British digital artists
English designers
Information visualization experts
Living people
Place of birth missing (living people)